Akça is a village in the Batman District of Batman Province in Turkey. The village is populated by Kurds of the Receban tribe and had a population of 1,322 in 2021.

The hamlets of Sincalı, Soğuksu, Şeyhçoban and Ünlüce are attached to the village.

References 

Villages in Batman District
Kurdish settlements in Batman Province